"Swimming with the Kids" is a song by the Finnish rock band The Rasmus, originally released on the band's third album Hell of a Tester on 2 November 1998.

The single was released in 1999 by the record label Warner Music Finland. It was the second and the last single from the album Hell of a Tester. It features a remixed version of the track "Tempo", which was remixed by DJ Midas and can't be found anywhere. Also the single contains a new version of the track "Life 705" for the year 1999, though this version of "Life 705" can be found on the band's compilation album, Hell of a Collection (2001).

"Swimming with the Kids" is a pretty funky song and not very serious. It was written by lead singer Lauri Ylönen and produced by the band themselves and Teja Kotilainen. No music video has been made for this song.

Single track listing
 "Swimming with the Kids" – 3:55
 "Tempo" (Remix by DJ Midas)
 "Life 705" (Version '99)

Personnel
 Lauri Ylönen – vocals
 Pauli Rantasalmi – guitar
  Luke Wadey - Kazoo
 Eero Heinonen – bass
 Janne Heiskanen – drums

External links
 The Rasmus' official website
 Lyrics

The Rasmus songs
1999 singles
1998 songs
Warner Music Group singles
Songs written by Lauri Ylönen